Dog in space may refer to:

A Dog in Space, a 1966 Spanish film
Soviet space dogs, dogs sent into space in the 1950s and 60s.